Elk Island Airport  is located on Elk Island in Gods Lake, Manitoba, Canada.

References

Registered aerodromes in Manitoba